is a song recorded by Japanese duo Yoasobi. It was released digitally as a standalone single on February 16, 2022, through Sony Music Entertainment Japan. Written by Ayase, the song is about the desire of an android for their owner, based on 159th Naoki Prize-winning novelist Rio Shimamoto's Watashi Dake no Shoyūsha, one of four stories from the novel collection Hajimete no, which was published on the same day as the single. Commercially, "Mr." reached number 11 on the Billboard Japan Hot 100, and number 19 on the Oricon Combined Singles Chart.

Background and release

On December 1, 2021, the same day as the EP The Book 2 release, Yoasobi announced a collaboration with four Naoki Prize-winning novelists: Rio Shimamoto, Mizuki Tsujimura, Miyuki Miyabe, and Eto Mori; for writing and singing songs based on the novelists' stories under the theme of "a story to read when you first did". All four novels were published as a book, titled Hajimete no, on February 16, 2022. With the theme "a story when you first fell in love", Shimamoto's novel  is about a "first feeling" of android Boku towards their owner Mr. Naruse.

On January 26, during their radio show Yoasobi's All Night Nippon X, Yoasobi revealed the title of the song "Mr.", based on Shimamoto's novel. They made a poll on Twitter for fans to guess the single's release date between February 16, 18, or 21. On February 8, Yoasobi revealed the snippet at Fuji TV's morning show Mezamashi TV and announced that the single would be released on February 16 to digital music and streaming platforms, alongside the teaser video. The full song was aired for the first time at the radio show hosted by the duo on the same day. The single's cover artwork was designed by Tomoko Kikuchi.

Composition

"Mr." is described as a "painfully ephemeral" city pop song about the desire of an android to their owner, written by Ayase, a member of Yoasobi. The band member Zaquro Misohagi participates in the song's chorus. It was composed in the key of C♯ minor, 120 beats per minute with a running time of three minutes and seven seconds. Shimamoto commented the song "gently evoked memories of people I could not meet anymore."

Music video

An accompanying music video for "Mr." was premiered on May 22, 2022, at 8:00 PM (JST), preceded by the teaser video on May 9. Produced by Ijiken Tokyo, who previously handled Yoasobi's "Halzion" music video, the music video depicts the android Boku reminiscing a memory with their owner Mr. Naruse before the owner is severely injured and dies in a large-scale catastrophe.

Commercial performance

"Mr." entered the Oricon Combined Singles Chart at number 19 and the Digital Singles (Single Track) Chart at number two with 18,914 downloads in its first week. For Billboard Japan, the song debuted at number 11 on the Japan Hot 100. It sold 16,227 download units in its first week, charting at number two on the Download Songs, behind only Aimer's "Zankyōsanka". The song also debuted at number 46 on the Streaming Songs, and peaked at number 33. Globally, "Mr." reached number 143 on the Billboard Global Excl. U.S.

Live performances

Yoasobi gave the debut performances of "Mr." at 2022 Rock in Japan Festival on August 6, 2022, and Rising Sun Rock Festival on the 12th.

Credits and personnel

Credits adapted from YouTube.

Song
 Ayase – songwriter, producer
 Ikura – vocals
 Zaquro Misohagi – chorus
 Rio Shimamoto – based story writer
 Tomoko Kikuchi – cover artwork design

Music video

 Toshitaka Shinoda (Ijiken Tokyo) – director
 Yūki "Youkiss" Ōkubo (Ijiken Tokyo) – producer
 Mahiru Kurumizawa (Ijiken Tokyo) – assistant
 Rina Satō (Ijiken Tokyo) – assistant
 Pomodorosa – character draft
 Liberty Animation Studio Co., Ltd. – animation work
 Hyōe Ishida – episode director, CG, photography, composite
 Yutaka Satō – episode director, photography, composite
 Rio – character design, key animation director
 Michael Tanaka – key animation
 Tokito Satō – key animation
 Aoumi Nishihara – key animation
 Hana Nagao – key animation
 Mayuko Konosue – key animation
 Ai Tsuda – key animation
 Yuuta Kevin Kenmotsu – key animation
 Taku Kondō – key animation
 Shōhei Nishijima – key animation
 Ayaka Miura – key animation
 Ruki Matsui – key animation
 Tatsuya Miki – key animation
 Saranrappu – key animation
 Shirokuma – key animation
 Mizuki Ihara – key animation
 Tomomi Ise – in-between animation, touch-up animation
 Studio Hibari – in-between animation, touch-up animation
 Tomoko Tsuchiya – CG
 Chihori Muro – CG
 Yusuke Takeda (Bamboo) – art, setting
 Kentarō Ōnuki (Bamboo) – art, setting
 Fujisaki Teru – photography, composite
 Takuya Sakamoto – work producer
 CALF – image scene animation
 Yūta Kuniyasu – animation director, animator
 Eri Okazaki – animator
 Rino Shōda – animator
 Shin Hashimoto – animator
 Shūma Hirose – producer
 Leol (A4A Inc.) – motion graphics director
 Masaru Ishii – management
 Shū Horiuchi (.MP) – art director
 Muniku (.MP)  – imageboard graphic design
 MN3 (.MP) – imageboard graphic design
 Takayuki Oguma – book editor
 Kōsei Nozaki – assistant

Charts

Weekly charts

Year-end charts

Release history

References

External links
 

2022 singles
2022 songs
Japanese-language songs
Songs about robots
Sony Music Entertainment Japan singles
Yoasobi songs